The Puerto Rico Department of Health (PRDOH) is one of the Cabinet-level agencies directly created by Article 4, Section 6 of the Constitution of Puerto Rico. It is headed by a Secretary of Health, appointed by the Governor of Puerto Rico and requiring the advice and consent of the Senate of Puerto Rico. The Secretary of Health is eighth in the line of gubernatorial succession.

Regions 
There are seven regions of Puerto Rico as defined by the Department of Health: Arecibo, Bayamón, Caguas, Fajardo, Mayagüez, Metro, and Ponce.

Agencies
 style="margin: 0 auto"
! scope=col style="text-align: left" | Name in English
! scope=col style="text-align: left" | Name in Spanish
! scope=col style="text-align: left" | Abbreviation in Spanish
|-
| Administration of Mental Health and Anti-Addiction Services
| Administración de Servicios de Salud Mental y Contra la Adicción
| ASSMCA
|-
|}

Secretary

References

 
Executive departments of the government of Puerto Rico
1912 establishments in Puerto Rico